Iraan High School is a public high school located in Iraan, Texas (US) and classified as a 1A school by the UIL. It is part of the Iraan-Sheffield Independent School District located in extreme east central Pecos County. In 2015, the school was rated "Met Standard" by the Texas Education Agency. It is the home of the Iraan Braves and Bravettes.

Athletics
The Iraan Braves compete in these sports - 

Cross country, Football, Basketball, Powerlifting, Golf, Tennis & Track.

Basketball
Cross Country
Football
Golf
Powerlifting
Tennis
Track and Field

Iraan Braves

Football 

The Iraan Braves were district champions for 4 years in a row, with the streak ending in 2017.

State Titles
Boys Cross Country - 
2001(1A), 2002(1A), 2003(1A)
Girls Cross Country - 
2002(1A)
Football - 
1996(2A)
Boys Golf - 
1954(B), 1972(1A), 2004(1A), 2005(1A)
Girls Golf - 
1984(1A)

Band
Marching Band State Champions
1980(1A), 1981(1A), 1983(1A), 1986(2A), 1987(2A), 1990(2A), 1991(2A),

References

External links
Iraan-Sheffield ISD

Public high schools in Texas
Schools in Pecos County, Texas